The HWA Heavyweight Championship was the heavyweight title contested in the Heartland Wrestling Association.

Title history

See also
Heartland Wrestling Association

References

External links
HWA Heavyweight Title History at Cagematch.net

Heartland Wrestling Association championships
Heavyweight wrestling championships